Eloise Frances "Ellie" Laity (born 9 May 1994) is a Welsh international field hockey player, who plays as a midfielder for Wales.

Career

Club hockey
Laity plays club hockey in the Women's England Hockey League Premier Division for Clifton Robinsons.

She has also played for Buckingham.

National team
Eloise Laity made her debut for Wales in 2014, during a test–series against Canada in Cardiff.

The most notable representation of her hockey career came at the 2018 Commonwealth Games, where despite finishing second to last, was Laity's first major tournament with the national team.

International goals

References

External links
 
 

1994 births
Living people
Welsh female field hockey players
British female field hockey players
Field hockey players at the 2018 Commonwealth Games
Commonwealth Games competitors for Wales